André Lamy (born 29 August 1932) is a French wrestler. He competed in the men's Greco-Roman middleweight at the 1960 Summer Olympics.

References

External links
 

1932 births
Living people
French male sport wrestlers
Olympic wrestlers of France
Wrestlers at the 1960 Summer Olympics
Sportspeople from Puy-de-Dôme